George T. Wilson (1912 – ?) was an English professional footballer who played as a goalkeeper in Scottish football for Dreghorn, Galston and Ayr United and in the Football League for York City.

References

1912 births
Footballers from Kingston upon Hull
Year of death missing
English footballers
Association football goalkeepers
Galston F.C. players
Ayr United F.C. players
York City F.C. players
Scottish Football League players
English Football League players